Dr. Qibla Ayaz is the current chairman of the Council of Islamic Ideology (CII).

Early life
He was born on the 6th October 1953 in Bannu, Khyber Pakhtunkhwa, Pakistan.

Education
After earning his Masters in Islamic Studies from the University of Peshawar in 1975, in which he will serve as vice-chancellor later, he got his PhD from the University of Edinburgh in the field of Islamic and Middle Eastern Studies in 1985, his unpublished thesis being, in 2 volumes, An unexploited source for the History of the Saljūqs: A translation of and critical commentary on the Akhbār Al-Dawlat Al-Sajūqiyya, under the supervision of Dr Carole Hillenbrand.

Publications
He has published 5 books and more than 20 research articles.

References

21st-century Pakistani people
People from Bannu District
Living people
Pakistani academic administrators
Alumni of the University of Edinburgh
Vice-Chancellors of the University of Peshawar
1953 births